Pluherlin is a commune in the Morbihan department of Brittany in north-western France.

Geography
The river Arz flows eastward through the commune. The northern part of the commune  belongs to a forest covered area called in french les Landes de Lanvaux.

Map

Demographics
Inhabitants of Pluherlin are called in French Pluherlinois.

See also
Communes of the Morbihan department

References

External links

 Mayors of Morbihan Association 

Communes of Morbihan